Paulus van Beresteyn (1582 – 1666), was a Dutch lawyer in Haarlem, known best today for his portrait painted by Frans Hals in 1619.

Biography
He was a lawyer in Haarlem who lived first on the Wijngaardstraat, and later on the Zijlstraat. He rented the house on the Wijngaardstraat from the heirs of Arnout van Beresteyn (1556-1612), a family relation. During the years 1615-1617 he was commissioner of the court of justice in Haarlem. He first married Elisabeth Sybrands. She died and in 1618 he married a second time to Anna van Steyn, who died less than a year later, probably in childbirth. Catharina Both van der Eem, who was his third wife, had her portrait made to match his marriage portrait, when they married in Leiden op 12 December 1619. Because later historians have attributed Catharina's pendant to Pieter Soutman, it is unclear whether this portrait was first prepared by Hals, whose portrait of Paulus matches the pendant in many respects. Catharina also features in the Beresteyn family portrait, which includes their daughter Emerantia and son Claes.

All of these portraits hung in the Hofje van Beresteyn thanks to their son Claes who founded it.

References

1582 births
1666 deaths
17th-century Dutch lawyers
People from Haarlem
Frans Hals